Lusagyugh (also Romanized as Lusagyukh, Lusagekh, and Lusaghyugh; until 1935, Nerk’in Turkmenlu and Turkmenlu) is a town in the Armavir Province of Armenia.

See also 
Armavir Province

References 

Populated places in Armavir Province